Leo Katz may refer to:
 Leo Katz (artist) (1887–1982), American artist
 Leo Katz (lawyer), American professor of law
 Leo Katz (statistician) (1914–1976), American statistician